The Liberal Party of Australia held a leadership ballot on 20 January 1966, following the resignation of Robert Menzies. Incumbent deputy leader Harold Holt was elected unopposed as his successor, and was sworn in as prime minister on 26 January. William McMahon defeated Paul Hasluck in the ballot to replace Holt as deputy leader.

Background
Robert Menzies had been leader of the Liberal Party since its creation in 1945, and prime minister since 1949. There had been persistent rumours that he would retire for several years. He turned 71 in December 1965, and on 26 December informed his press secretary, Tony Eggleton, that he would leave office early the following year. Menzies told cabinet on 19 January 1966, and the following day called a joint meeting of the Coalition (the Liberal Party and the Country Party) during which he announced his intentions; this was followed by a press conference in the evening.

Leadership election

About 15 minutes after the joint meeting ended, the Liberal Party met separately to elect Menzies' successor. Treasurer Harold Holt, the party's deputy leader since 1956, was elected unopposed. According to Holt's biographer, Tom Frame, "the change of Liberal Party leadership was achieved with remarkable ease and without any destabilising lobbying [...] there were not discontented rivals to provoke either ministerial resistance or backbench revolt". Holt told his wife Zara that he was proud to have become prime minister "without stepping over anyone's body".

Deputy leadership election
As Holt had assumed the leadership, there was also a vote held for the deputy leadership. William McMahon, the Minister for Labour and National Service, won a close vote over Paul Hasluck, the Minister for External Affairs. There were apparently multiple ballots, as voting took 40 minutes to complete, but the end tallies were kept secret. Holt and his new ministry were not sworn in until 26 January, with the delay partially due to the death and funeral of Shane Paltridge, the Minister for Defence.

References

Liberal Party of Australia leadership spills
1966 elections in Australia
January 1966 events in Australia
Robert Menzies
Liberal Party of Australia leadership election